The 2008 Ole Miss Rebels football team represented the University of Mississippi during the 2008 NCAA Division I FBS football season. The team's head coach was Houston Nutt, who served his first season in the position and replaced Ed Orgeron, who was fired after accumulating a 10–25 record at Ole Miss from 2005 to 2007. The Rebels played their seven home games in 2008 at Vaught–Hemingway Stadium in Oxford, Mississippi.

Season summary
With an 8–4 regular-season record and a 5–3 mark in the SEC, head coach Houston Nutt revived a Rebel squad that was coming off four straight losing seasons and a 3–9 campaign with no conference wins in 2007. It marked the team's best improvement from one season to the next since former coach Johnny Vaught's debut in 1947.  Projected to place fifth in the SEC Western Division in the pre-season, the Rebels finished second in the division, having defeated the previous two national champions on the road, #4 Florida and #18 LSU, and ended the regular season on a five-game win streak.

On December 8, the Associated Press announced that Rebels offensive tackle Michael Oher, defensive tackle Peria Jerry and kicker Joshua Sheene were selected for the first team of the Associated Press All-Southeastern team. Oher was a unanimous pick. Receiver Dexter McCluster was a second-team pick. On December 9, the Southeastern Conference announced that Oher and Jerry were named to the first team of the All-SEC team selected by the 12 league coaches.  On December 10, the Southeastern Conference announced that Ole Miss head coach Houston Nutt was named the Southeastern Conference coach of the year, sharing the award with Alabama's Nick Saban and Vanderbilt's Bobby Johnson. Michael Oher was awarded the Jacobs Blocking Trophy, given to the league's top blocker.  The 2008 College Football All-America Team included Michael Oher and Peria Jerry.

Rankings

Harris Interactive publishes their final ranking on Week 15 (the end of the season), before the bowl games are played. The Bowl Championship Series final standings are released on Week 15. Neither publish a ranking or standing after the bowl games are complete.

Schedule

Personnel

Coaching staff

Game summaries

Memphis 
Pregame Line: Ole Miss –9.5

Ole Miss opened the 2008 season with new head football coach Houston Nutt by beating state-line rival Memphis, 41–24.  The game started off quick for the Rebs as Jevan Snead hit Shay Hodge for a 70 yd TD strike on the game's second possession and never looked back.  The game also featured the introduction of the "Wild Rebel" off of which Dexter McCluster scored a touchdown.

Wake Forest 
Pregame Line: Wake Forest –7

Ole Miss lost 30–28 after Wake Forest kicked a 42-yard field foal with three seconds remaining in the game.  In a game with several lead changes, Ole Miss took the lead with just over one minute remaining in the fourth quarter on a fourth and goal Jevan Snead touchdown pass. Wake Forest played down the field in 53 seconds, aided by 2 penalties, to set up the game-winning field goal.

Samford 
Pregame Line: N/A

Vanderbilt 
Pregame Line: Ole Miss –7

Ole Miss lost to the Vanderbilt Commodores in the final minute of the game as Vanderbilt forced Ole Miss' Dexter McCluster to fumble the game-winning touchdown at the goal line.

at Florida 
Pregame Line: Florida –23

The Ole Miss Rebels posted its 600th win in school history on September 27, 2008 when it defeated the Florida Gators 31–30 at Ben Hill Griffin Stadium in Gainesville, Florida, giving the season's conference champion, Florida, its only loss of the 2008 season. This was also Ole Miss' first win over a Top 5 ranked team since 1977 when the Rebels defeated Notre Dame. Notre Dame went on to win the national championship that year.

Florida went into the game undefeated at 3–0. Never trailing Ole Miss by more than a touchdown, Florida came within an extra point of tying the game at the end of the fourth quarter. Ole Miss had different plans in mind, however, as the extra point kick was blocked, and Florida was held to 30. While the defense was able to force a punt out of Ole Miss on the next possession and get the ball back inside Ole Miss territory, Florida found itself with the choice between converting a 4th-and-1 situation or attempting a long field goal. Florida opted to go for the first down, but the Ole Miss defense stopped QB Tim Tebow and he did not convert the one-yard run. The game ended as time expired during Ole Miss' ensuing possession.

Florida won their remaining regular season games and went on to defeat #1 Alabama in the 2008 SEC Championship. Florida then defeated #2 Oklahoma to claim the 2009 FedEx BCS National Championship.

South Carolina 
Pregame Line: Ole Miss –2

Following Ole Miss' win over Florida, Sports Illustrated featured Ole Miss on the cover. Then Ole Miss went on to lose to South Carolina in what many Ole Miss fans refer to as the continuation of the Sports Illustrated Cover Jinx. The last time Ole Miss was featured on the Sports Illustrated cover was in 1970. After the cover ran, which was a picture of then Ole Miss quarterback Archie Manning, Manning suffered a broken arm during the season. 
On more than one occasion, the Rebels had a chance to pull away, but South Carolina forced timely turnovers to keep themselves alive.  In the end, the Rebs gave one too many gifts to SC and the Gamecocks were able to sneak out of Oxford with a win.

Alabama 
Pregame Line: Alabama –12.5

After several early failed drives in the opening quarter, Ole Miss became the first team to score on Alabama in the first quarter, as well as the first to have a lead against the Crimson Tide. However, the Crimson Tide answered back on their next drive with a touchdown, giving Alabama a 7–3 lead to end the first quarter. Ole Miss had limited offense in the second quarter as the Tide defense held a shutout for the remainder of the half. However, the Tide offense scored 17 points with a 2-yard rush touchdown, a 41-yard field goal, and a 30-yard touchdown pass. Alabama led the Rebels 24–3 at halftime.

However, the second half was different as the Crimson Tide failed to score for the remainder of the game. Ole Miss head coach Houston Nutt, who had previously coached at Arkansas, gambled on a 4th–and–goal with a fake field goal attempt, as Rob Park passed to Jason Cook for a 9-yard touchdown. Several minutes into the fourth quarter, Ole Miss again cut into Alabama's lead when Jevan Snead threw a 17-yard touchdown strike to Shay Hodge, as the Rebels trailed 24–17 after a Joshua Shene extra point. Three minutes later, Shene hit a 35-yard field goal, cutting Alabama's lead again to 24–20. A stalled drive forced Alabama punter P. J. Fitzgerald to give the ball to the Rebels with 3:03 left. The Rebels moved the ball steadily down the field over the next two minutes, however they turned it over on downs after a failed 4th–and–5 on Alabama's 43-yard line.

Arkansas 
Pregame Line: Arkansas –6.5

Ole Miss head coach Houston Nutt returned to Arkansas in his first game against his former team, the Arkansas Razorbacks. Ole Miss, and Houston Nutt, won 23–21.

Auburn 
Pregame Line: Ole Miss –6.5

The Auburn rivalry had been running steady ever since Head coach Tommy Tuberville bolted Oxford for the Plains.  In his fifth, and what would be his final return trip, the Rebels were finally able to emerge as a winner.  In a defensive struggle, the Rebels picked off the Tigers three times in the fourth quarter, and were able to put the game away on a Brandon Bolden touchdown run midway through the fourth quarter.  The final count, Ole Miss 17 Auburn 7

Louisiana Monroe 
Pregame Line: Ole Miss –24

Ole Miss shutout Louisiana Monroe 59–0 to become bowl eligible for the first time since 2003.

LSU 

Pregame Line: LSU –3

Source: 
    
    
    
    
    
    
    
    

In this 97th meeting of Ole Miss and LSU, the first time referred to as the Magnolia Bowl, Ole Miss snapped a six-game losing streak against LSU, beating the defending national champions 31–13. Ole Miss' last win against LSU was in 2001.

Mississippi State 

Pregame Line: Ole Miss –18

Source: ESPN
    
    
    
    
    
    
    

Ole Miss won the most lopsided Egg Bowl since the Rebels won 48–0 in 1971, by beating Mississippi State 45–0. Only once in this game did the Mississippi State offense cross the 50-yard line into Ole Miss territory. Ole Miss held MSU to just 37 total yards including minus 51 rushing yards. Ole Miss set a school record with 11 sacks. Mississippi Statewide receiver Brandon McRae was carted off the field after breaking his leg in the second quarter.

Cotton Bowl Classic 

Pregame Line: Texas Tech –4

The #20 Rebels defeated the #8 Texas Tech Red Raiders 47–34 in the 2009 AT&T Cotton Bowl Classic in Dallas, Texas on January 2, 2009. The Red Raiders and the Rebels had met in bowl games twice before—1986 Independence Bowl and 1998 Independence Bowl—with Ole Miss winning both. The teams also met during the 2002 and 2003 regular seasons with Texas Tech winning both games of the home-and-home series.

The Rebels' last bowl bid came 5 years ago and ironically in the Cotton Bowl Classic, a 31–28 victory over Oklahoma State. In this Cotton Bowl Classic, Ole Miss made its fourth appearance in the Cotton Bowl Classic, now carrying a 3–1 record. The Rebels defeated Texas Christian University 14–13 in the 1956 game and dropped a 12–7 decision to Texas in 1962.

Statistics

Team

Scores by quarter

Offense

Rushing

Passing

Receiving

Defense

Special teams

NFL prospects
Nine Ole Miss players who ended their career at Ole Miss this year were either taken in the 2009 NFL Draft or signed contracts with NFL teams.  Michael Oher and Peria Jerry were first round draft picks at #23 and #24 respectively. Oher was drafted by the Baltimore Ravens while Jerry was drafted by the Atlanta Falcons. Mike Wallace was the 84th pick going to the Pittsburgh Steelers in the third round. Jamarca Sanford was the 231st pick going to the Minnesota Vikings in the seventh round. Additionally, Maurice Miller signed a free agent deal with the Tampa Bay Buccaneers, Jason Cook signed a free agent deal with the Baltimore Ravens, the late Tony Fein signed a free agent deal with the Seattle Seahawks and later was signed by the Baltimore Ravens and later cut, Ashlee Palmer signed a free agent deal with the Buffalo Bills and Jermey Parnell signed a free agent deal with the New Orleans Saints. Fein was found dead on October 7, 2009.

References

Ole Miss
Ole Miss Rebels football seasons
Cotton Bowl Classic champion seasons
Ole Miss Rebels football